Slab Point is a rocky point on the northwest coast of Varna Peninsula, Livingston Island in the South Shetland Islands, Antarctica forming the north side of the entrance to Eliseyna Cove and the south side of the entrance to Charybdis Cove.

The feature is descriptively named from the ice cliffs bounding it to the south.

Location

Maps
 L.L. Ivanov et al. Antarctica: Livingston Island and Greenwich Island, South Shetland Islands. Scale 1:100000 topographic map. Sofia: Antarctic Place-names Commission of Bulgaria, 2005.
 L.L. Ivanov. Antarctica: Livingston Island and Greenwich, Robert, Snow and Smith Islands. Scale 1:120000 topographic map.  Troyan: Manfred Wörner Foundation, 2009.

References
Composite Antarctic Gazetteer.

Headlands of Livingston Island